The National Forestry Agency is an agency of the Albanian government responsible for overseeing the management of forests, their preservation and development and the sustainable and multifunctional use of forest resources in Albania as natural assets of national importance. The agency is a subordinate institution of the Ministry of Tourism and Environment.

Overview
The National Forestry Agency was established on 17 July 2019, pursuant to Article 100 of the Constitution and Article 6 of Law no. 90/2012, "On the organization and operation of the state administration", following the proposal of the Minister of Tourism and Environment Blendi Klosi. The agency is a public budgetary legal entity, under the supervision of the ministry responsible for the environment, with headquarters in Tirana and is financed primarily by the state budget and from other legal sources.

AKP is responsible for ensuring performance in the forestry sector by assessing the conditions of forests, administering inventory, working on research in the field of forestry, organizing projects and drafting documents for forest management, monitoring and control.

References